USNS Silas Bent (T-AGS-26) was a Silas Bent class survey ship acquired by the United States Navy in 1964 and delivered to the Military Sealift Command in 1965. Silas Bent spent her career in the Pacific Ocean performing  oceanographic surveys.

Construction
Silas Bent (AGS-26), an oceanographic survey ship, was laid down in March 1964 by the American Shipbuilding Co. at Lorain, Ohio and launched on 16 May 1964 sponsored by sisters and granddaughters of Silas Bent, Miss Nancy M. McKinley and Mrs. Jeffrey R. Grandy. The ship was delivered to the Military Sea Transportation Service (now the Military Sealift Command) in July 1965.

Oceanographic survey operations
Silas Bent—the first of a new class of oceanographic survey ships—was manned by a Civil Service crew and operated by the Military Sealift Command as an integrated system for the gathering of vital oceanographic data in both underway and on-station modes. The data she collected was recorded in a form immediately usable by computers. She was under the technical control of the Naval Oceanographic Office then located in Suitland, Maryland. The oceanographic survey ship completed her shakedown cruise during the winter of 1965 and 1966. The ship was assigned operations including the Navy's ASW/USW Oceanwide Survey Project supporting antisubmarine and undersea warfare weapons systems, primarily in the northern Pacific.

Survey examples
The ship completed the first full year of ASW/USW Oceanwide Survey Project, an effort to perform comprehensive surveys of strategic ocean areas, during fiscal year 1967. The first of the year was spent in the Atlantic with work in the Labrador Sea followed by a search for the reported American Scout Seamount. The June 1966 survey found no evidence of a seamount with no soundings less than  but did find strong returns from the Deep Scattering Layer that could be mistaken for shoals. Following additional surveys in the Gulf of Maine and north of Bermuda the ship was transferred to the Pacific in December 1966. The remainder of the fiscal year was spent surveying north of Hawaii into the Gulf of Alaska.

On 8 August 1968 Silas Bent departed Hakodate, Japan for surveys east of Kamchatka but was diverted on 12 August to an area south of Amchitka Island, Alaska to assist in the search, termed CHASE VI SALVOPS, for the  Liberty ship Robert L. Stevenson which was to be scuttled with a load of ammunition but failed to immediately sink and sunk in an unknown position. After six days on station the survey ship located the lost ship using a deep towed magnetometer and narrow beam echosounder with confirmation by photographs using a deep sea camera. After the search the ship returned to Japan for regular survey operations with a limited survey in the Sea of Okhotsk before transit to San Francisco arriving 30 October. On departure from San Francisco to Sasebo, Japan between 15 and 28 March 1968 the ship conducted underway transit data and planted current meter and thermister array buoys in the Sea of Japan. From 11 April to 14 May the ship conducted joint acoustic operations with the RV F. V. Hunt which was also assigned work for the ASW/USW Surveys Project. The two ships continued operations in the Sea of Japan and Sea of Okhotsk into June 1968.

In 1972, she visited Japan, for the 2nd annual Ocean Development Conference held at Tokyo. During the conference, there were numerous tours and briefings held on Silas Bent describing, for the ocean scientists of the world, her capabilities for measuring bathymetric depth, magnetic intensity, gravity, surface temperature, seismic reflection, sound velocity, ambient light, and salinity. As of mid-September 1974, Silas Bent engaged in special operations in the area of Kodiak, Alaska. The ship conducted surveys for about a month in the Sea of Okhotsk beginning on 25 September 1986.

USNS Silas Bent was transferred under the Security Assistance Program to the Republic of Turkey 29 September 1999 and stricken from the Naval Vessel Register on 28 October 1999.

Turkish service
As TCG Çeșme (A-599) the ship continued work as a hydrographic and oceanographic survey ship and was joined by sister ship USNS Elisha Kent Kane (T-AGS-27) which was renamed Çandarli (A-588).

Honors and awards
Qualified Silas Bent personnel were eligible for the following:
Navy Battle "E" Ribbon
National Defense Service Medal

References

See also

NavSource: USNS Silas Bent (T-AGS-26)
NavSource: USNS Silas Bent (T-AGS-26) Introduction Brochure
United States Navy
Oceanography

Ships built in Lorain, Ohio
1964 ships
Cold War auxiliary ships of the United States
Survey ships of the United States Navy
Oceanographic research ships of the United States Navy
Ships transferred from the United States Navy to the Turkish Navy